The River may refer to:

Films 
 The River (1929 film), an American film by Frank Borzage
 The River (1933 film), a Czech film by Josef Rovenský
 The River (1938 film), an American film by Pare Lorentz
 The River (1951 film), a French film by Jean Renoir
 Nehir or The River, a 1977 Turkish film by Şerif Gören
 The River (1984 film), an American film by Mark Rydell
 The River (1997 film), a Taiwanese film by Tsai Ming-liang
 The River (2001 film), a Finnish film by Jarmo Lampela
 Reka (2002 film), a Russian film by Aleksey Balabanov
 The River (2018 film), a Kazakhstani film by Emir Baigazin

Literature 
 The River (play), a 1925 play by Patrick Hastings
 "The River" (short story), a 1955 short story by Flannery O'Connor
 The River (novel), a 1991 novel by Gary Paulsen
 The River, a novel by Eden Phillpotts
 The River, a book about a debunked theoretical origin of HIV/AIDS by Edward Hooper
 The River, a fictional river in the Riverworld series by Philip Jose Farmer

Music

Albums 
 The River (Ali Farka Touré album) (1991)
 The River (Bruce Springsteen album) (1980)
 The River (Jordan Feliz album), and the title song (see below) (2016)
 The River (Ketil Bjørnstad album) (1997)
 The River, an album by Mick Stevens
 The River, an album by Neal Morse

Songs 
 "The River" (Elgar), a composition of Edward Elgar
 "The River" (Breed 77 song) (2004)
 "The River" (Garth Brooks song) (1992)
 "The River" (Good Charlotte song) (2007)
 "The River" (Jordan Feliz song) (2016)
 "The River" (Liam Gallagher song), 2019
 "The River" (Delta Goodrem song) (2016)
 "The River" (Noel Gourdin song) (2007)
 "The River" (Live song) (2006)
 "The River" (Bruce Springsteen song) (1980)
 "The River" (The Tea Party song) (1993)
 "The River", a song by 10 Years from From Birth to Burial
 "The River", a song by Anathallo from Canopy Glow 
 "The River", a song by Meredith Andrews from The Invitation
 "The River", a song by Aurora from A Different Kind of Human (Step 2)
 "The River", a song by the Beautiful South from Painting It Red
 "The River", a song by Joe Bonamassa from Had to Cry Today
 "The River", a song by Tim Buckley from Blue Afternoon
 "The River", a song by David Byrne and Brian Eno from Everything That Happens Will Happen Today
 "The River", a song by Tom Chaplin from The Wave
 "The River", a song by the Cult from Sonic Temple
 "The River (Le Colline Sono In Fiore)", a song by Ken Dodd
 "The River Song", a song by Donovan from The Hurdy Gurdy Man
 "The River", a song by Dan Fogelberg from Home Free
 "The River", a song by Missy Higgins from The Sound of White
 "The River", a song by Imagine Dragons from It's Time
 "The River", a song by Lyfe Jennings from The Phoenix
 "The River", a song by King Gizzard & the Lizard Wizard from Quarters!
 "The River" or "River", a song by King Trigger
 "The River", a song by Ladyhawke from Wild Things
 "The River", a song by John Martyn from The Apprentice
 "The River", a song by Parkway Drive from Atlas
 "The River", a song by Santana from Festival
 "The River", a song by Sentenced from Crimson
 "The River", a song by Spirit from California Blues
 "The River (Tongo)", a song by Mike Stern from Voices
 "The River", a song by Strawbs from Bursting at the Seams
 "The River", a song by Sun Kil Moon from April
 "The River", a song by Wage War from Blueprints
 "The River", a song by Wild Orchid from the self-titled album
 "The River", a song by Hank Williams, Jr. from Ballads of the Hills and Plains
 "The River", a song by Keller Williams from Freek
 "The River", a song by Chely Wright from The Metropolitan Hotel

Radio stations
 The River, KIWR 89.7 FM, Council Bluffs, Iowa, United States
 The River, WXRV 92.5 FM, Haverhill, Massachusetts, United States
 The River, WRSI 93.9 FM, Turners Falls, Massachusetts, United States
 The River, WOLZ 95.3 FM, Fort Myers, Florida, United States
 The River, WZRV 95.3 FM, Front Royal, Virginia, United States
 The River, WERV-FM 95.9 FM, Chicago, Illinois, United States
 The River, KRVE 96.1 FM, Baton Rouge, Louisiana, United States 
 The River, WSRV 97.1 FM, Gainesville, Georgia, United States
 The River, WRVV 97.3 FM, Harrisburg, Pennsylvania, United States
 The River, KVRV 97.7 FM, Santa Rosa, California, United States
 The River, CFAN-FM 99.3 FM, Miramichi, New Brunswick, Canada
 The River, WRVE 99.5 FM, Schenectady, New York, United States
 The River, WVRV 101.5 FM, Montgomery, Alabama, United States
 The River, WURV 103.7 FM, Richmond, Virginia, United States
 The River, WCVO 104.9 FM, Gahanna, Ohio, United States
 Triple M The Border, 105.7 FM, Albury, New South Wales, Australia, formerly branded The River
 The River, WHCN 105.9 FM, Hartford, Connecticut, United States
 The River, KRVK 107.9 FM, Vista West, Wyoming, United States

Television
 The River (South African TV series), a telenovela
 The River (UK TV series), a 1988 television series starring David Essex
 The River (U.S. TV series), a 2012 paranormal/adventure/horror series
 "The River" (Cold Case), an episode of Cold Case
 The River (Norwegian TV series), a 2017 crime television series

Other uses
 The River (artwork), a 1994 fountain in Victoria Square, Birmingham, England
 The River (Greece), a political party in Greece
 The River (skyscraper), a building in Bangkok, Thailand
 The River (dance), choreographed (1970) by Alvin Ailey to a score of the same title by Duke Ellington

See also
 River (disambiguation)
 River Song (disambiguation)
 La Rivière (Maillol)
 The Ties That Bind: The River Collection, a 2015 compilation album by Bruce Springsteen
 Te Awa (disambiguation)